Julio César Iemma (born 3 July 1954) is an Argentine sports shooter. He competed in the men's 50 metre rifle prone event at the 1988 Summer Olympics.

References

External links
 

1954 births
Living people
Argentine male sport shooters
Olympic shooters of Argentina
Shooters at the 1988 Summer Olympics
Place of birth missing (living people)